Jayden David Darrel Gardner (born May 14, 2000) is an American college basketball player for the Virginia Cavaliers of the Atlantic Coast Conference (ACC). He previously played for the East Carolina Pirates.

High school career
Gardner played for Heritage High School in Wake Forest, North Carolina for four years. He averaged 22.9 points and 15.1 rebounds per game as a junior and was named CAP-8 Conference Player of the Year and First Team All-State, leading his team to a 28–2 record. As a senior, Gardner averaged 24.3 points and 13.9 rebounds per game. He led Heritage to the NCHSAA Class 4A state championship game, where he recorded 30 points and 13 rebounds. He was named Northern Athletic Conference Player of the Year and was a First Team All-State selection. Gardner finished high school with the second-most points behind Donald Williams and the most rebounds and free throws made in Wake County history. He was rated a three-star recruit by 247Sports and Rivals and committed to play college basketball for East Carolina over offers from Penn State and VCU, among others.

College career

East Carolina
In his third game at East Carolina, on November 11, 2018, Gardner recorded 30 points and 10 rebounds in an 84–78 overtime win over Lamar. He became the third freshman in school history to score at least 30 points in a game. On November 21, Gardner posted 28 points and 17 rebounds in a 76–64 victory over Prairie View A&M. Six days later, he tallied 30 points and 15 rebounds in a 95–86 loss to UNC Wilmington, becoming the first-ever American Athletic Conference (AAC) freshman with multiple 30-point games. On January 13, 2019, Gardner posted a career-high 35 points and 20 rebounds in a 76–65 loss to UCF. He became the first East Carolina player since 1966 with a 30-point, 20-rebound game and the first freshman in AAC history to record at least 35 points or 20 rebounds in a game. Two days later, he was named USBWA National Freshman of the Week. As a freshman, Gardner averaged 16.3 points and 8.5 rebounds per game, setting school freshman records for rebounds and free throws and AAC freshman records for points per game and free throws. He led all NCAA Division I freshmen in free throws, with 171, and registered 10 double-doubles. He was a five-time AAC Freshman of the Week and was unanimously selected to the AAC All-Rookie Team.

On November 5, 2019, Gardner made his sophomore season debut, tallying 28 points and 11 rebounds in an 80–68 win over VMI. On January 1, 2020, he recorded a season-high 29 points and 10 rebounds in a 75–69 loss to Wichita State. Gardner scored 29 points again and grabbed a season-high 19 rebounds in a 69–59 loss to Houston on January 29. Gardner became the third-fastest East Carolina player to reach 1,000 career points in a February 12 loss to Tulsa. On February 23, he scored 29 points for his third time during the season, while grabbing 13 rebounds in a 67–63 victory over Temple. As a sophomore, he averaged an AAC-leading 19.7 points, 9.2 rebounds and 2.2 assists per game, posting 13 double-doubles, and was named to the Second Team All-AAC. He averaged the third-most points in school history. As a junior, Gardner averaged 18.3 points and 8.3 rebounds per game, earning First Team All-AAC honors.

Virginia
On April 12, 2021, Gardner transferred to Virginia for his final two seasons of eligibility, choosing the Cavaliers over offers from Arkansas, LSU, Miami, and NC State, among others. All Division I athletes who played in the 2020–21 season gained an extra year of eligibility. On December 3, he scored 15 points and hit the game-winning putback shot in a 57–56 win against Pittsburgh. Gardner was named to the Third Team All-ACC.

In the Cavaliers’ 2022–23 season opener, Gardner reached the 2,000 career point milestone. On January 8, 2023 he recorded his 1,000th rebound, joining an exclusive list of Division I players who reached both the 2000-point / 1000-rebound milestones.

Career statistics

College

|-
| style="text-align:left;"| 2018–19
| style="text-align:left;"| East Carolina
| 31 || 31 || 30.6 || .493 || .200 || .750 || 8.5 || 1.3 || .8 || .5 || 16.3
|-
| style="text-align:left;"| 2019–20
| style="text-align:left;"| East Carolina
| 31 || 30 || 34.3 || .521 || .200 || .734 || 9.2 || 2.2 || 1.1 || .5 || 19.7
|-
| style="text-align:left;"| 2020–21
| style="text-align:left;"| East Carolina
| 19 || 18 || 35.1 || .479 || .500 || .737 || 8.3 || 1.4 || .6 || .2 || 18.3
|-
| style="text-align:left;"| 2021–22
| style="text-align:left;"| Virginia
| 35 || 35 || 32.7 || .501 || .214 || .793 || 6.4 || 1.4 || .5 || .4 || 15.3
|-
| style="text-align:left;"| 2022–23
| style="text-align:left;"| Virginia
| 33 || 33 || 26.3 || .510 || .000 || .685 || 5.8 || .7 || .9 || .5 || 12.0
|- class="sortbottom"
| style="text-align:center;" colspan="2"| Career
| 149 || 147 || 31.5 || .503 || .226 || .741 || 7.5 || 1.4 || .8 || .4 || 16.1

See also
 List of NCAA Division I men's basketball players with 2,000 points and 1,000 rebounds

References

External links
Virginia Cavaliers bio
East Carolina Pirates bio

2000 births
Living people
American men's basketball players
Basketball players from North Carolina
East Carolina Pirates men's basketball players
Power forwards (basketball)
Sportspeople from Durham, North Carolina
Virginia Cavaliers men's basketball players